Taphonia is a genus of moths of the family Erebidae. The genus was described by Schaus in 1916.

Species
Taphonia griseirena Schaus, 1916 Mexico
Taphonia lysis (H. Druce, 1891) Mexico, Costa Rica, Guatemala
Taphonia muscosa (H. Druce, 1890) Mexico
Taphonia peonis Schaus, 1916 Mexico
Taphonia semifasciata Schaus, 1916 Mexico
Taphonia testacealis Dyar, 1918 Mexico

References

Herminiinae